Irene Ann Stegun (February 9, 1919 – January 27, 2008) was an American mathematician at the National Bureau of Standards (NBS, now the National Institute of Standards and Technology) who edited a classic book of mathematical tables called A Handbook of Mathematical Functions, widely known as Abramowitz and Stegun.

Early life and education 
Stegun was born in Yonkers, New York, the daughter of Richard Stegun and Regina Skakandi Stegun. Her parents were both immigrants from central Europe. Her father owned a restaurant. She trained as a teacher, and later completed a master's degree in mathematics at Columbia University.

Career 
Stegun began her mathematical career during the Second World War. After teaching mathematics at a Catholic school in New York, she joined the Planning Committee of the Mathematical Tables Project of the WPA. In that role, she learned the basics of numerical analysis from the committee's chair, Gertrude Blanch. While working at the Mathematics Tables Project, she completed her master's degree at Columbia.

In 1948, Stegun and a handful of other members of the Mathematical Tables Project moved to Washington, D.C., where they set up the Computation Laboratory of the National Bureau of Standards. She eventually rose to assistant chief of the Computation Laboratory at NBS. In 1965, Stegun was awarded a Gold Medal from the Department of Commerce for her efforts in completing the project. She held the position of assistant chief of the Computing Lab until she became the interim director in 1965.

Publications 
Stegun and Milton Abramowitz co-edited a book of mathematical tables called A Handbook of Mathematical Functions (1964). The handbook is considered a classic, "a major cooperative endeavor" and "one of the very few scientific activities of the 1950s led by a woman." The pair also wrote articles for academic journals including Physical Review, Journal of the Society for Industrial and Applied Mathematics, and Mathematics of Computation. Abramowitz died in 1958, before their book was published. With other co-authors, she also had publications in the Journal of Applied Physics and the Journal of Research of the National Bureau of Standards.

 "Generation of Coulomb Wave Functions by Means of Recurrence Relations" (1955, with Milton Abramowitz)
 "Pitfalls in Computation" (1956, with Milton Abramowitz)
 "Generation of Bessel Functions on High Speed Computers" (1957, with Milton Abramowitz)
 "Ferroelectric Switching and the Sievert Integral" (1963, with P. H. Fang)
 "Automatic computing methods for special functions" (1970, with Ruth Zucker)
 "Automatic computing methods for special functions. Part II. The exponential integral En (x)" (1974, with Ruth Zucker)
 "Automatic computing methods for special functions. Part III. The sine, cosine, exponential integrals, and related functions" (1976, with Ruth Zucker)
 "Automatic Computing Methods for Special Functions. Part IV. Complex Error Function, Fresnel Integrals, and Other Related Functions" (1981, with Ruth Zucker)

Death 
Stegun died in 2008, at the age of 88, in Danbury, Connecticut.

See also 
 Timeline of women in science

References

People from Yonkers, New York
20th-century American mathematicians
Numerical analysts
1919 births
2008 deaths
Department of Commerce Gold Medal
20th-century American women scientists
20th-century American scientists
20th-century women mathematicians
Mathematicians from New York (state)
21st-century American women